Filip Chytil (born 5 September 1999) is a Czech professional ice hockey centre for the  New York Rangers of the National Hockey League (NHL). He was drafted by the Rangers in the first round, 21st overall, in the 2017 NHL Entry Draft. Internationally, Chytil played for the Czech Republic national under-18 team at several tournaments.

Playing career
Chytil played for PSG Zlín of the Czech Extraliga during the 2016–17 season. He recorded four goals and four assists in 38 games, which was the second highest total of games played, goals, assists and points among all players under age 18 in the league. He also played two games for Zlín's junior affiliate. A top prospect for the 2017 NHL Entry Draft, he was selected 21st overall by the New York Rangers. Shortly after the NHL Draft, Chytil was selected seventh overall in the Canadian Hockey League (CHL) Import Draft by the North Bay Battalion. On 14 July 2017, Chytil signed a three-year, entry-level contract with the New York Rangers.

After participating in the Rangers' training camp, Chytil impressed and was selected by the local media with the Lars-Erik Sjöberg Award as top rookie in camp. He made it through the pre-season to earn a spot on the Rangers opening-night roster for the 2017–18 season. He secured a scoring role playing between Mats Zuccarello and Rick Nash. However, after playing two games at the NHL level, he was reassigned to the Rangers' American Hockey League (AHL) affiliate, the Hartford Wolf Pack. Chytil and fellow first-round pick Lias Andersson were called up by the Rangers on 25 March 2018. Chytil recorded his first NHL goal on 30 March 2018, in a 7–3 loss to the Tampa Bay Lightning. On 29 July 2021, Chytil was re-signed to a two-year contract by the Rangers.

International play
Chytil was a member of the Czech Republic under-18 team that won gold at the 2016 Ivan Hlinka Memorial Tournament.

Career statistics

Regular season and playoffs

International

References

External links
 

1999 births
Living people
Czech ice hockey centres
Hartford Wolf Pack players
National Hockey League first-round draft picks
New York Rangers draft picks
New York Rangers players
People from Kroměříž
PSG Berani Zlín players
Sportspeople from the Zlín Region
Czech expatriate ice hockey players in the United States